The Wisconsin Badgers softball team represents the University of Wisconsin–Madison in NCAA Division I college softball.  The team participates in the Leaders Division of the Big Ten Conference. The Badgers are currently led by head coach Yvette Healy. The team plays its home games at the Goodman Softball Complex located on the university's campus.

Year-by-year results

Championships

Conference tournament championships

Coaching staff

Notable players
Big Ten Player of the Year
Kayla Konwent, 2019

See also
List of NCAA Division I softball programs

References

External links